Ctenorhabdotus capulus is an extinct species of ctenophore (or comb jelly), known from the Burgess shale in British Columbia, Canada. It is approximately 515 to 505 million years old and was equipped with 24 comb rows, three times as many as known  from modern ctenophores. 5 specimens of Ctenorhabdotus are known from the Greater Phyllopod bed, where they comprise < 0.1% of the community.

See also 
Burgess Shales ctenophores in addition to Ctenorhabdotus
Fasciculus vesanus
Xanioascus canadensis

References

External links 
 

Prehistoric ctenophore genera
Burgess Shale fossils
Cambrian genus extinctions